Beyhan Çalışkan (born 6 April 1960) is a retired Turkish football midfielder and manager.

References

1960 births
Living people
Turkish footballers
Bursaspor footballers
Adana Demirspor footballers
Kayserispor footballers
Sarıyer S.K. footballers
Turkey international footballers
Turkish football managers
Bursaspor non-playing staff
Fethiyespor managers
Altay S.K. managers
Sarıyer S.K. managers
Association football midfielders